Pilewort is a common name for plants that were traditionally used to treat piles.(hemorrhoids)
This herb was more commonly used throughout the Tudor period in England. 
Pilewort may refer to

 Erechtites hieracifolia, or burnweed, a plant in the aster family
 Ficaria verna, or lesser celandine, a plant in the buttercup family